Folksworth is a village and former civil parish, now in the parish of Folksworth and Washingley, in Cambridgeshire, England. Folksworth is situated within Huntingdonshire which is a non-metropolitan district of Cambridgeshire as well as being a historic county of England. In 1931 the parish had a population of 120.

History

Folksworth was listed as Folchesworde  in the Domesday Book in the Hundred of Normancross in Huntingdonshire. In 1086 there was just one manor at Folksworth; the annual rent paid to the lord of the manor in 1066 had been £5 and the rent had fallen to £4 in 1086.

The Domesday Book does not explicitly detail the population of a place but it records that there were 22 households at Folksworth. There is no consensus about the average size of a household at that time; estimates range from 3.5 to 5.0 people per household. Using these figures then an estimate of the population of Folksworth in 1086 is that it was within the range of 77 and 110 people.

The Domesday Book uses a number of units of measure for areas of land that are now unfamiliar terms, such as hides and ploughlands. By 1086, the hide had become a unit of tax assessment rather than an actual land area; a hide was the amount of land that could be assessed as £1 for tax purposes. The survey records that there were eight ploughlands at Folksworth in 1086.

The tax assessment in the Domesday Book was known as geld or danegeld and was a type of land-tax based on the hide or ploughland. It was originally a way of collecting a tribute to pay off the Danes when they attacked England, and was only levied when necessary. Following the Norman Conquest, the geld was used to raise money for the King and to pay for continental wars; by 1130, the geld was being collected annually. Having determined the value of a manor's land and other assets, a tax of so many shillings and pence per pound of value would be levied on the land holder. While this was typically two shillings in the pound the amount did vary; for example, in 1084 it was as high as six shillings in the pound.  For the manor at Folksworth the total tax assessed was five geld.

In 1086 there was no church at Folksworth.

Governance

Folksworth is part of the civil parish of Folksworth and Washingley, which has a parish council. The parish council is elected by the residents of the parish who have registered on the electoral roll; the parish council is the lowest tier of government in England. A parish council is responsible for providing and maintaining a variety of local services including allotments and a cemetery; grass cutting and tree planting within public open spaces such as a village green or playing fields. The parish council reviews all planning applications that might affect the parish and makes recommendations to Huntingdonshire District Council, which is the local planning authority for the parish. The parish council also represents the views of the parish on issues such as local transport, policing and the environment. The parish council raises its own tax to pay for these services, known as the parish precept, which is collected as part of the Council Tax. Folksworth and Washingley Parish Council meets at the village hall on the 3rd Tuesday of the month at 7.20 pm. On 1 April 1935 the parish of Folksworth was abolished to form "Folksworth and Washingley".

Folksworth was in the historic and administrative county of Huntingdonshire until 1965. From 1965, the village was part of the new administrative county of Huntingdon and Peterborough. Then in 1974, following the Local Government Act 1972, Folksworth became a part of the county of Cambridgeshire.

The second tier of local government is Huntingdonshire District Council which is a non-metropolitan district of Cambridgeshire and has its headquarters in Huntingdon. Huntingdonshire District Council has 52 councillors representing 29 district wards. Huntingdonshire District Council collects the council tax, and provides services such as building regulations, local planning, environmental health, leisure and tourism. Folksworth is a part of the district ward of Elton and Folksworth and is represented on the district council by one councillor. District councillors serve for four-year terms following elections to Huntingdonshire District Council.

For Folksworth the highest tier of local government is Cambridgeshire County Council which has administration buildings in Cambridge. The county council provides county-wide services such as major road infrastructure, fire and rescue, education, social services, libraries and heritage services. Cambridgeshire County Council consists of 69 councillors representing 60 electoral divisions. Folksworth is part of the electoral division of Norman Cross and is represented on the county council by two councillors.

At Westminster Folksworth is in the parliamentary constituency of North West Cambridgeshire, and elects one Member of Parliament (MP) by the first past the post system of election. Folksworth is represented in the House of Commons by Shailesh Vara (Conservative). Shailesh Vara has represented the constituency since 2005. The previous member of parliament was Brian Mawhinney (Conservative) who represented the constituency between 1997 and 2005.

Demography

Population
In the period 1801 to 1901 the population of Folksworth was recorded every ten years by the UK census.  During this time the population was in the range of 119 (the lowest was in 1801) and 209 (the highest was in 1871).

From 1901, a census was taken every ten years with the exception of 1941 (due to the Second World War). From 1951 the population was shown in the civil parish of Folksworth and Washingley

All population census figures from report Historic Census figures Cambridgeshire to 2011 by Cambridgeshire Insight.
The parishes of Folksworth and Washingley were combined into a single parish between 1931 and 1951.

Culture and community
Folksworth has a village hall, a church (St Helens) and a small primary school of four classes, teaching ages 4 to 11. There is also a preschool which operates for four days per week in the village hall for children age 2 to 4.

The village's only public house (The Fox), had closed down in 2013 but re-opened in April 2017 as a pub and restaurant.

Folksworth also has a playing field called Folksworth Fun Park with a cricket wicket, goalposts and much play equipment for children.

'Folklore' magazine is delivered four times a year to each house in the parish.

Religious sites

St Helen's Church (Church of England) in Morborne Road was first built in 1150 AD. The church was restored in 1850 when the chancel was entirely rebuilt and the vestry added, the north wall of the nave largely rebuilt, and a bell-cote built on the west gable. It is a Grade II* listed building.

Services are held each Sunday morning in the church at 11.00 am (other than the second Sunday which is at 9.30 am), except the first Sunday in the month when there is a Family service which is held in the school hall.

References

External links

Villages in Cambridgeshire
Former civil parishes in Cambridgeshire
Huntingdonshire